Robert Ernest Clothier (26 March 1877 – 31 May 1964) was an Australian politician. Born in Queensland, he received a primary education before becoming a bookmaker. Moving to Perth, Western Australia, he became a foreman at a boot factory and secretary of the Bootmakers' Union. In 1933 he was elected to the Western Australian Legislative Assembly as the Labor member for Maylands, holding the seat until 1936. In 1937, he was elected to the Australian Senate as a Labor Senator for Western Australia. He was defeated in 1949 after he was demoted on the ticket to make way for union secretary Don Willesee. Clothier died in 1964.

References

1877 births
1964 deaths
Australian Labor Party members of the Parliament of Australia
Members of the Australian Senate for Western Australia
Members of the Australian Senate
Australian people of Scottish descent
Australian trade unionists
20th-century Australian politicians